Mirror Moves is the fourth studio album by English rock band the Psychedelic Furs, released in 21 August 1984 by Columbia Records, two years after their previous studio album, Forever Now (1982).

The album includes the dance hit "Heartbeat" and the chart hits "Heaven" and "The Ghost in You". Despite substantial success internationally, "Heaven" was not released as a single in America. Instead, another track from the album, "Here Come Cowboys", was released, although the music videos for both songs received substantial airplay on MTV.

Furs drummer Vince Ely had left the band, leaving lead vocalist Richard Butler, bassist Tim Butler and guitarist John Ashton to work as a trio. Producer Keith Forsey handled the majority of the drumming on the album, with session musician Thommy Price playing on two tracks. The cover artwork and design was a tribute to artist Barney Bubbles, who had died the previous year. He was acknowledged in the credits with the words "after Barney Bubbles".

Mirror Moves became their second album to be certified gold in the US.

In 1985, Robert Smith  of the Cure cited Mirror Moves as one of his five favorite albums during the promotion of The Head on the Door (1985).

Track listing

Personnel
The Psychedelic Furs
 Richard Butler – lead and background vocals
 John Ashton – guitar
 Tim Butler – bass guitar

Additional personnel
 Tommy Price – drums on tracks 2 and 3
 Mars Williams – saxophone
 Keith Forsey – drum machine; drums; percussion
 Ed Buller – keyboards (uncredited)

Production and artwork
 Keith Forsey – producer
 Steve Hodge – engineer
 Richard Butler – cover design
 Da Gama – cover design
 Brian Griffin – photography

Charts

Weekly charts

Year-end charts

Certifications

References

External links
 

The Psychedelic Furs albums
Albums produced by Keith Forsey
1984 albums
Albums recorded at Electric Lady Studios
Columbia Records albums